Alexander Arthur Van Halen (born May 8, 1953) is an American musician, best known as the drummer and co-founder of the rock band Van Halen. The band was formed in 1972 by Alex Van Halen, his younger brother Eddie, David Lee Roth, and Mark Stone under the name "Mammoth" before adding Michael Anthony in 1974 and changing their name to Van Halen. Warner Bros. signed the band in 1977, and the band's debut album was released a year later. Prior to their disbandment in 2020, following Eddie's death, Van Halen released 12 studio albums, and the brothers were the only two constant members of the band.

Early life 
Van Halen was born in Amsterdam. His Dutch father, Jan van Halen (1920–1986), was an accomplished jazz saxophonist and clarinetist. His mother, Eugenia van Beers (1914–2005), was an Indo (Eurasian) from Rangkasbitung, Dutch East Indies (now Indonesia). Alex spent his early years in Nijmegen in the east of the Netherlands. The family moved to Pasadena, California, in 1962. Alex and his brother Eddie became naturalized U.S. citizens.

Both brothers were trained as classical pianists during childhood. Although Alex is known as a professional drummer, he began his musical aspirations as a guitarist, with his brother Eddie taking up drums. While Eddie was delivering newspapers to pay for his drum kit, Alex would practice playing on them. After spending some time playing Eddie's drum kit, Alex became more skilled than Eddie was as a drummer. After Eddie heard Alex's mastery of The Surfaris drum solo in the song "Wipe Out", he decided to learn to play the electric guitar. Alex was influenced by Budgie drummer Ray Phillips.

Alex, Eddie and three other boys formed their first band when they were in the fourth grade, calling themselves The Broken Combs; they performed at lunchtime at Hamilton Elementary School in Pasadena, California.

In 1971, Van Halen graduated from Pasadena High School. He then took classes in music theory, scoring, composition and arranging at Pasadena City College for a short while. While there, Alex met Michael Anthony and David Lee Roth. They formed the band Mammoth, and Alex, along with the others, left Pasadena City College.

Musical career 
Alex and Eddie Van Halen had several early bands before the formation of Van Halen. In addition to The Broken Combs, there were The Space Brothers, The Trojan Rubber Company, and Mammoth.

In 1972, the brothers formed Mammoth with Mark Stone on bass and Eddie on lead vocals. The band rented David Lee Roth's PA system for their shows. Soon after, Eddie became tired of singing lead, and asked Roth to join the band. Later, in 1974, since the name Mammoth was already taken by another band, the name was changed to Van Halen, and Stone was replaced by Michael Anthony. Roth has claimed that it was his idea to rename the band Van Halen, and that he actually named it after Alex. In addition to his musical duties at this time, Alex handled managerial duties, such as booking gigs, and the like for the band. Their 1978 self-titled debut album Van Halen was released to much fanfare, influencing many musicians in hard rock. Van Halen had released eleven more studio albums since then, and officially disbanded a month after Eddie's death on October 6, 2020.

Although the term "brown sound" is generally associated with Eddie's guitar, it was actually coined by Alex to refer to the sound of his snare drum.

Alex never recorded any music without his brother being involved, with Michael Anthony saying that "the only person that he plays with is Ed." The only recording Alex has made outside of the band is playing keyboards in the Eddie instrumental "Respect the Wind", done for the Twister soundtrack and earning the Van Halen brothers a Grammy Award nomination for Best Rock Instrumental Performance).

Equipment

Van Halen endorses Ludwig drums, pedals and hardware, Paiste cymbals, Remo drumheads and Regal Tip drumsticks. A Paiste endorser since March 1983, Van Halen, in co-operation with Paiste developed a signature ride cymbal—a 2002 24" Big ride—which Paiste introduced at the 2010 Winter NAMM Show. He also had two Ludwig signature snares. Alex has used Rototoms and octobans in the past as well as electronic drums and is renowned for using extravagantly sized drum kits that feature an on-fire orchestral gong and four bass drums, having originally used only two.

Regal Tip created the Alex Van Halen signature drumsticks when he became an endorser.

Influences 
Van Halen's main influences include Billy Cobham, Ginger Baker, Keith Moon and John Bonham, and he has cited jazz drummer Buddy Rich's work as having an early and lifelong impact.

Personal life 

Van Halen married Valeri Kendall in June 1983, after a two-year engagement. The marriage ended in divorce two months later. Van Halen's first of two sons, Aric Van Halen, was born October 6, 1989; Aric's mother was Van Halen's then-wife, Kelly Carter, whom he divorced in August 1996 after 13 years of marriage. Van Halen married his current wife, Stine Schyberg, in 2000. She is the mother of his son Malcolm Van Halen. Van Halen is the uncle of Wolfgang Van Halen.

After the death of his father Jan in December 1986, Van Halen embraced sobriety in April 1987. 

Van Halen is an ordained minister. He presided at the second wedding of his brother Eddie in 2009 and presided at the second wedding of Valerie Bertinelli, his ex-sister in-law, in 2011. His son Aric is a passionate runner and competed in the Olympic trials for the steeplechase in 2016.

References

External links

 Official Van Halen website

1953 births
Living people
American heavy metal drummers
Dutch emigrants to the United States
American people of Dutch-Indonesian descent
American people of Javanese descent
Indo people
Pasadena City College alumni
People from Nijmegen
Musicians from Amsterdam
Naturalized citizens of the United States
Van Halen members
Dutch people of Javanese descent
Male drummers
20th-century American drummers
American male drummers
21st-century American drummers
Pasadena High School (California) alumni
American rock drummers